This article contains a list of fossil-bearing stratigraphic units in the state of Alabama, U.S.

Sites

See also

 Paleontology in Alabama

References

 

Alabama
Stratigraphic units
Stratigraphy of Alabama
Alabama geography-related lists
United States geology-related lists